Warrigundi is the site of a closed railway station on the Main North railway line in New South Wales, Australia. It is located about 17 km north of Werris Creek. The station was open between 1886 and 1975, initially as Terrible Vale, being renamed in 1913.

References

Disused railway stations in New South Wales
Main North railway line, New South Wales
Railway stations in Australia opened in 1886
1975 disestablishments in Australia
Railway stations closed in 1975